Danny LaPorte (born December 3, 1956) is an American former professional motocross racer. He was one of the top motocross racers in the 1970s and 1980s and, was the first American to win a 250cc motocross world championship.

Biography
Born in Los Angeles, California, LaPorte began riding in the early 1970s when the sport of motocross enjoyed a period of explosive growth. He began racing professionally when he turned 16 and by 1976 he was offered a job with the Suzuki factory racing team. In 1979, LaPorte won the AMA 500cc national championship for Suzuki. He was part of the victorious American Motocross des Nations team in 1981, marking the first time an American team had won the prestigious event.

Seeking new challenges, LaPorte decided to compete at the world championship level in 1982 riding for the Yamaha factory racing team. In his first attempt, he claimed the FIM 250cc motocross world championship against the heavily favored Georges Jobé.

Returning to America, LaPorte began to compete in desert racing and won the famous Baja 1000 three times as a member of the Kawasaki racing team. In the 1990s, he competed in international rally events, winning a stage and finishing second overall in the 1992 Paris-Dakar Rally. He also is the winner of 1991 Pharaohs rally in Egypt.

LaPorte currently resides in Southern California and still competes occasionally. In 2000, he was inducted into the AMA Motorcycle Hall of Fame. He was inducted again in 2003, this time as a member of the victorious 1981 Motocross des Nations team.

References

External links
 Danny LaPorte at the AMA Motorcycle Hall of fame

1957 births
Living people
Sportspeople from Torrance, California
American motocross riders
AMA Motocross Championship National Champions
Enduro riders
Off-road motorcycle racers